Dancing with the Stars. Taniec z gwiazdami (previously: Taniec z gwiazdami ) is a Polish light entertainment reality television series broadcast by Polsat. It is the Polish version of the United Kingdom's popular Dancing with the Stars / Strictly Come Dancing franchise which has been sold to more than 40 countries worldwide.

The show first aired on TVN in the spring of 2005. Since then, new season was aired every autumn and spring, except for a break between years 2012 and 2013.   

Every Sunday, ratings average more than 7 million viewers for the first airing. The highest rated episode was the second-season finale, when ratings were around 8 million people. 

Since the beginning of the show there have been four different presenters. Magda Mołek was the female host only during the show's first season. Hubert Urbański who originally hosted with Mołek during the first season, stayed with the show until mid-2007 after the fifth season. Katarzyna Skrzynecka, an actress and singer was the female co-host in seasons 2–12. Piotr Gąsowski was introduced in 2007 as the new host to replace Hubert Urbański. He is an entertainer and an actor. In season 13 Katarzyna Skrzynecka was replaced by Natasza Urbańska as the female co-host. In season 14 both hosts were replaced by Krzysztof Ibisz, well-known television host and Anna Głogowska, dancer, television host and the winner of 13th season. She was the female co- host in seasons 14–17. In season 18 Anna Głogowska was replaced by Paulina Sykut-Jeżyna as the female host. In season 25 Izabela Janachowska, former professional dancer, joined the host team.

The judging panel is composed of Iwona Szymańska-Pavlović, retired professional dancer and currently a dancing judge, Michał Malitowski, professional dancer, Andrzej Piaseczny, singer and Andrzej Grabowski, an actor and comedian.

Format
The show pairs a number of celebrities with professional dancers who each week compete against each other to impress a panel of judges and the viewing public in order to survive potential elimination. Through a telephone poll, viewers vote who should stay in the competition. The results of the poll are combined with the ranking of the panel of judges. Couple with lowest number of points drop out from each episode. Each judge gives the performance a mark out of ten, giving an overall total out of forty (thirty in seasons 22-24).

Cast timeline
Color key:

Professional dancers
Color key:

 Winner
 Runner-up
 Third place
 Celebrity partner was eliminated first for the season
 Celebrity partner withdrew from the competition
 Dancer withdrew from the competition

Series overview

Dances
Color key:

Group Dance Chart

Records

Number of perfect scores

The scores presented below represent the perfect scores which the celebrities gained in their original season.

Celebrities

Professionals
64: Rafał Maserak
45: Stefano Terrazzino
40: Jan Kliment
21: Łukasz Czarnecki
18: Tomasz Barański
14: Janja Lesar, Hanna Żudziewicz
13: Jacek Jeschke
12: Blanka Winiarska
11: Robert Rowiński
10: Kamila Kajak
8: Cezary Olszewski
7: Michał Danilczuk, Agnieszka Kaczorowska, Andrej Mosejcuk, Ewa Szabatin
6: Izabela Janachowska, Adam Król
4: Michał Bartkiewicz, Anna Głogowska, Marcin Hakiel, Aneta Piotrowska
3: Wojciech Jeschke, Wiktoria Omyła, Magdalena Soszyńska-Michno
2: Krzysztof Hulboj, Przemysław Juszkiewicz
1: Piotr Kiszka, Katarzyna Krupa, Jakub Lipowski, Valeriya Zhuravlyova

Highest-scoring celebrities
The scores presented below represent the best overall accumulative average scores the celebrity gained each season. Seasons in which the scores were out of 30 have been rounded to be out of 40.

Lowest-scoring celebrities
The scores presented below represent the worst overall accumulative average scores the celebrity gained each season. Seasons in which the scores were out of 30 have been rounded to be out of 40.

Professionals with the Most Wins

Specials

The All-Time Final

Couples

Scores

Opening: "Everybody Needs Somebody to Love" – Solomon Burke (Group VOLT)
Running order

Dance Chart

Dancing on Tour
In May and June 2006 Seasons 1-3 participants went on a tour around Poland with a specially-prepared dance show. The gig was called Dancing with the Stars – Dancing in your city (Taniec z Gwiazdami – Taniec w twoim Mieście). The pairs featured in the tour:
 Agnieszka Rylik (female boxer) and Marcin Olszewski,
 Małgorzata Foremniak (actress) and Rafał Maserak,
 Aleksandra Kwaśniewska (daughter of former Polish president Aleksander Kwaśniewski) and Michał Skawińśki,
 Katarzyna Cichopek (actress) and Marcin Hakiel,
 Rafał Mroczek (actor) and Aneta Piotrowska,
 Conrado Moreno (showman) and Magda Soszyńska,
 Piotr Gąsowski (actor) and Anna Głogowska.

'Best Of' episode
On 13 May 2007 TVN aired a special episode of Taniec z Gwiazdami – Najpiękniejsze tańce. This time the audience was choosing the best dance from previous seasons. The jury went dancing too, and was being judged by a special one-night panel of Kuba Wojewódzki (TV personality), Szymon Majewski (comedian and TV host) and Kazimiera Szczuka (literary critic and historian, feminist, writer, host of the Polish version of The Weakest Link). The pairs performing in this episode were:
 Joanna Jabłczyńska (actress) and Piotr Kiszka (Waltz)
 Joanna Liszowska (actress) and Robert Kochanek (Samba)
 Przemysław Sadowski (actor) and Ewa Szabatin (Jive)
 Aleksandra Kwaśniewska (daughter of the former president of Poland Aleksander Kwaśniewski) and Michał Skawiński (Tango)
 Krzysztof Tyniec (actor, cabaretman) and Kamila Kajak (Foxtrot)
 Kinga Rusin (TVN presenter) and Stefano Terrazino (Rumba)

Po prostu taniec (Just Dance!)
On 9 December 2007 TVN aired a special episode of Po Prostu taniec - So You Think You Can Dance and Taniec z Gwiazdami. 4 partecipants of 6th season of Taniec z Gwiazdami and 4 dancers of 1st season of So You Think You Can Dance have danced.
 Judges:
 Augustin Egurrolla – So You Think You Can Dance
 Michał Piróg – So You Think You Can Dance
 Iwona Pavlović – Dancing with the Stars
 Piotr Galiński – Dancing with the Stars
 Presenters:
 Kinga Rusin – So You Think You Can Dance
 Katarzyna Skrzynecka – Dancing with the Stars
 Piotr Gąsowski – Dancing with the Stars
 Musical Guests:  
 Isis Gee

Audience voting results

Guinness World record
On 31 August 2008 in Kraków the Guinness World Record was achieved. Augustin Egurolla (You Can Dance judge) and Iwona Pavlović (DWTS judge) were teaching 1635 people how to dance cha-cha-cha. 

Stars from Dancing with the Stars

Dancers from  So You Think You Can Dance"
 1st season: Maciej Florek, Maria Foryś, Ida Nowakowska, Piotr Gałczyk oraz Mariusz Jasuwienas
 2nd season: Artur Cieciórski, Katarzyna Kubalska, Gieorgij Puchalski, Anna Radomska i Justyna Białowąs
 Musical guests:
 Matt Pokora – "Catch Me If You Can", "Through the eyes", "Dangerous"
 Patrycja Markowska – "Świat się pomylił"

Taniec kontra Dance (Dance vs. Dance!)

Rating Figures

References

http://przeambitni.com/2014/05/26/kto-zatanczy-w-kolejnej-edycji-tanca-z-gwiazdami/

External links
  Official Site - Taniec z gwiazdami
  Taniec z gwiazdami on Polish Wikipedia

 
Dancing with the Stars
2005 Polish television series debuts
2011 Polish television series endings
2014 Polish television series debuts
2000s Polish television series
2010s Polish television series
2020s Polish television series
TVN (Polish TV channel) original programming
Polsat original programming
Polish television series based on British television series